Oonya Kempadoo (born 1966) is a novelist who was born in the United Kingdom of Guyanese parentage, her father being the writer Peter Kempadoo.

Biography
Born in Sussex, England, "of mixed Indian, African, Scottish, and Amerindian descent", Oonya Kempadoo was brought up in Guyana from the age of five. She has studied art in Amsterdam, and has also lived in Trinidad, St. Lucia, and Tobago. She now lives in St. George's, Grenada.

Kempadoo began writing seriously in 1997 and her first novel, Buxton Spice, a semi-autobiographical rural coming-of-age story, was published 1998. The New York Times described it as "superb, and superbly written". Her second book, Tide Running (Picador, 2001), set in Plymouth, Tobago, is the story of young brothers Cliff and Ossie. Tide Running won the Casa de las Americas Literary Prize for best English or Creole novel.

Both of these books were nominated for International Dublin Literary Awards, the first in 2000 and the second in 2003.

In 2011, she participated in the International Writing Program's Fall Residency at the University of Iowa in Iowa City, IA.

She was named a Great Talent for the Twenty-First Century by the Orange Prize judges and is a winner of the Casa de las Américas Prize.

Her third novel All Decent Animals (Farrar, Straus and Giroux, 2013) was recommended on Oprah's 2013 Summer Reading List by Karen Russell, who said: "How am I only now finding out about this writer? It's as if she's inventing her own language, which is incantatory, dense, and lush. The authority and blood pulse of it seduced me."

Bibliography
 Buxton Spice (W&N, 1998). new edition, Phoenix House, 1999; 
 Tide Running. Picador, 2001; 
 All Decent Animals. Farrar, Straus & Giroux, 2013;

References

External links
 Oonya Kempadoo's official website.
 Allyson Latta, "'Living in That Moment': Interview with Grenada-based novelist Oonya Kempadoo", Memories into Story, 11 March 2013.
 Simon Lee, "The excitement of writing: Oonya Kempadoo", Caribbean Beat, Issue 54 (March/April 2002).

People from Sussex
1966 births
Living people
Guyanese women novelists
20th-century English novelists
English people of Guyanese descent
Black British women writers
21st-century English novelists
20th-century English women writers
21st-century English women writers
International Writing Program alumni
British expatriates in Grenada